Ayuchevo (Ayıwsı) is a rural locality (a selo) and the administrative centre of Ayuchevsky Selsoviet, Sterlitamaksky District, Bashkortostan, Russia. The population was 297 as of 2010. There are 4 streets.

Geography 
Ayuchevo is located 31 km southwest of Sterlitamak (the district's administrative centre) by road. Ozerkovka is the nearest rural locality.

References 

Rural localities in Sterlitamaksky District